Eliel da Silva (born 16 November 2001) is a Brazilian professional footballer who plays as a left back for Guarani.

References

External links

Living people
2001 births
Brazilian footballers
Association football defenders
Guarani FC players
Campeonato Brasileiro Série B players